The Japanese Community Youth Council (JCYC) is a non profit community organization dedicated to serving the children, youth and families living in the San Francisco Bay Area, California. Established in 1970, JCYC has become one of San Francisco’s most successful youth organizations. While still committed to children and youth from the Japanese American community, JCYC has evolved and grown into an organization, which annually serves over 8,000 young people from all socio-economic and ethnic backgrounds.

References

External links
Japanese Community Youth Council official site

Non-profit organizations based in California

Organizations based in San Francisco